José María Linares-Rivas (17 March 1901 - 13 April 1955) was a Spanish actor. He appeared in more than seventy films from 1933 to 1955.

Selected filmography

References

External links 

1901 births
1955 deaths
Spanish male film actors
Spanish emigrants to Mexico